The 2009 FIVB Volleyball Men's World Grand Champions Cup was held in Osaka and Nagoya, Japan from 18 to 23 November 2009.

Qualification

Competition formula
The competition formula of the 2009 Men's World Grand Champions Cup was the single Round-Robin system. Each team plays once against each of the 5 remaining teams. Points were accumulated during the whole tournament, and the final standing was determined by the total points gained.

Squads

Venues
 Osaka Municipal Central Gymnasium, Osaka, Japan
 Nippon Gaishi Hall, Nagoya, Japan

Results
All times are Japan Standard Time (UTC+09:00).

|}

Osaka round

|}

Nagoya round

|}

Final standing

Team Roster
Bruno, Sidão, Vissotto, Giba, Murilo, Théo, Sérgio, Thiago, João Paulo, Rodrigão, Lucas, Marlon
Head Coach: Bernardinho

Awards
MVP:  Robertlandy Simón
Best Scorer:  Kunihiro Shimizu
Best Spiker:  Tatsuya Fukuzawa
Best Blocker:  Robertlandy Simón
Best Server:  Robertlandy Simón
Best Setter:  Bruno Rezende
Best Libero:  Sérgio Santos

External links
Official website
NTV website 

FIVB Volleyball Men's World Grand Champions Cup
World Grand Champions Cup
FIVB Women's World Grand Champions cup
V